The Birley Academy, previously known as Birley Community College, is a secondary school in Birley, Sheffield, South Yorkshire, England. It is part of the LEAD Academy trust. The headmistress is Gina Newton.

Facilities
The school is split into three levels, the topmost one being the modern foreign languages block; the first floor being English, Languages, Science, Art, Food Technology and Graphics; and the ground floor containing Maths, History, Creative iMedia, Drama, Music, Geography, BTEC Tourism, Resistant Materials, PE and Religious Studies.

The school has a Main Hall with a projected screen for presentations. The school has many areas to eat lunch, or to a have break. There are seating areas outside Music, Maths and Design Technology. The main areas to eat are the canteen (dining hall) where students can order food and sit there, outside the Hot and Cold Snack Bars, where there are numbers of seating, the DT courtyard, where students can sit outside as well as the main hall, where the large seats are pulled up to make space for dining tables, this means there are always places to sit.

The school contains a learning resource centre equipped with technology such as interactive whiteboards and computer systems. The school also has dedicated special needs previsions, with a pastoral care department and a separate section of the school, the Interactive Resources Unit, dedicated to assisting children with learning difficulties access mainstream education. Birley also has a Drama Studio with fully equipped lighting and sound and a large number of instruments and electronic musical equipment (i.e. Mac computers, synth drums and Keyboards) in the Music department.

Available GCSE Courses
Courses available at Birley are: Math, English, Science (combined and separate), Food Preparation and Nutrition, Graphics, Creative iMedia, Art, Music, Drama, History, BTEC Sport Science, BTEC Travel and Tourism, Geography, BTEC Engineering, GCSE French and Resistant Materials.

Headteachers

 2009-11: Mr. Wood
 2011-12: Mrs. Woodcock
 2012-17: Mr. Robinson (initially Acting Head)
 2017–present: Mrs. Gina Newton

The school is part of the LEAD Trust with Charnock Hall Primary Academy, Birley Primary Academy, Birley Spa Primary School and Rainbow Forge Primary Academy.

Inspections

In the 2010 Ofsted school inspection, the school achieved an overall 'Good'.

In the 2015 Ofsted school inspection, the school received a 'Requires Improvement'.

In the 2020 Ofsted school inspection, the school received a 'Requires Improvement'.

History

Thornbridge School
It is the former Thornbridge School, the former Thornbridge Grammar School also known as Birley Thornbridge Grammar School. The first headmaster of Thornbridge Comprehensive School was Walter Snook.

Birley School
The school has connections with the village of Pwani Mchangani, Zanzibar.

Birley Secondary Modern School existed throughout the 1960s.

In 2012 work began to demolish the old building and replace it with a new modern one. The construction of the new building finished in early January of the same year. 

The site is off the A6135 (former A616) in south-east Sheffield, north of Birley Lane tram stop.

In 2017 it was granted academy status and became part of the LEAD Academy trust alongside three local feeder schools as well as two other secondary schools.

Notable former pupils

Thornbridge Grammar School
 Phil Burgan - racing driver and businessman
 Tommy Eyre - Musician

Thornbridge School
 George Hinchliffe - musician, founder of the Ukulele Orchestra of Great Britain

Birley Community College
 Regan Slater - Professional footballer. (Midfielder)

Former teachers
 Veronica Hardstaff from 1986-94 she taught French and German, Labour MEP from 1994-99 for Lincolnshire and Humberside South (the only MEP it had), and married to Alan Billings, the South Yorkshire Police and Crime Commissioner since 2016

See also
 Totley-Thornbridge College of Education also known as Totley Hall College of Education, which became part of Sheffield City Polytechnic in 1976

References

External links
 Birley Community College web page
 Birley Learning Community website
 The Birley Academy Website

Academies in Sheffield
Secondary schools in Sheffield